Dussac is a commune in the Dordogne department in Nouvelle-Aquitaine in southwestern France.

Population

Sights
 Château de Dussac, listed historic site

See also
Communes of the Dordogne department

References

Communes of Dordogne
Arrondissement of Nontron